In November 2007, EP Estradas de Portugal SA became the successor to EP - Estradas de Portugal, E.P.E. (a.k.a. Estradas de Portugal or EP) which had been the agency responsible for administering the roads in Portugal since 2004. EP Estradas de Portugal SA is a company which is 100% owned by the Government of Portugal has a 75-year concession to develop, plan and maintain the road network of Portugal, with the exception of most of the county's motorways, which are run by BRISA SA.

Predecessors
EP is the successor to the Junta Autónoma das Estradas (JAE), which existed from 1927 until 1999, when JAE was replaced by three agencies: Instituto das Estradas de Portugal (IEP), Instituto para a Construção Rodoviária (ICOR), Instituto para a Conservação e Exploração da Rede Rodoviária (ICERR).  In 2002, ICOR and ICERR were merged into a single agency - IEP. In 2004, IEP is replaced by EP - Estradas de Portugal E.P.E.

Plano Rodoviário Nacional
See Roads in Portugal.

References

External links
 Estradas de Portugal
 PRN 2000 - Plano Rodoviário Nacional

Private road operators
Transport companies of Portugal